Rematch is a Sammy Hagar compilation album.

Rematch may also refer to:

 Replay (sports)
 REMATCH (Randomized Evaluation of Mechanical Assistance for the Treatment of Congestive Heart Failure), a clinical trial for a ventricular assist device
 Re:Match, a 1982 album by Armageddon Dildos
 "Rematch", a 2000 song by Dave Angel and Darren Emerson
 "Rematch", a 2018 song by musical duo MXM

See also
 Riddim Driven: Rematch, a 2002 installment of VP Records' Riddim Driven series